Andres Bonifacio Avenue, also known as A. Bonifacio Avenue, is a  national secondary road connecting the North Luzon Expressway and Epifanio de los Santos Avenue at Balintawak Interchange in Quezon City and Blumentritt Road at the city's boundary with Manila in a north–south direction.

Etymology 
The road is named after the Filipino revolutionary and Supremo of the Katipunan, Andres Bonifacio alongside other similarly named roads located in Metro Manila like as the one in Marikina and in Intramuros.

Route description  
The road starts at the Balintawak Interchange in Quezon City and continues until the intersection with Del Monte Avenue and Mayon Street where it makes a westward turn and continues until arriving at the intersection with Blumentritt Road at the city's boundary with Manila. A segment of Skyway Stage 3 currently runs above the avenue's segment from Sgt. Rivera and 5th Avenues (C-3) to the Balintawak Interchange. 

Adjacent to the Balintawak Interchange is Ayala Land's Cloverleaf complex and its shopping mall, Ayala Malls Cloverleaf. It also forms the eastern perimeter of the Manila North Cemetery from past Tagaytay Street up to Blumentritt Road.

History

Andres Bonifacio Avenue forms part of an old road that linked the city of Manila with Novaliches historically called Bonifacio-Manila Road, Manila–Novaliches Road, and La Loma-Balintawak Road,. It historically formed part of Route 52 or Highway 52. The portion of the road north of the present-day EDSA is presently known as Quirino Highway. The northern end of the avenue was involved in the construction of Balintawak Interchange in 1966–1968, wherein the Manila North Diversion Road was built as its new continuation to the north.

Intersections

References 

Streets in Quezon City